Martina Navratilova and Pam Shriver successfully defended their title, defeating Kathy Jordan and Anne Smith in the final, 6–4, 6–1 to win the ladies' doubles tennis title at the 1982 Wimbledon Championships.

Seeds

  Martina Navratilova /  Pam Shriver (champions)
  Kathy Jordan /  Anne Smith (final)
  Rosie Casals /  Wendy Turnbull (semifinals)
  Barbara Potter /  Sharon Walsh (second round)
  Sue Barker /  Ann Kiyomura (second round)
  JoAnne Russell /  Virginia Ruzici (quarterfinals)
  Leslie Allen /  Mima Jaušovec (third round)
  Candy Reynolds /  Paula Smith (third round)
  Billie Jean King /  Ilana Kloss (second round)
  Rosalyn Fairbank /  Tanya Harford (second round)
  Andrea Jaeger /  Betsy Nagelsen (second round)
  Mary-Lou Piatek /  Wendy White (third round)

Draw

Finals

Top half

Section 1

Section 2

Bottom half

Section 3

Section 4

References

External links

1982 Wimbledon Championships – Women's draws and results at the International Tennis Federation

Women's Doubles
Wimbledon Championship by year – Women's doubles
Wimbledon Championships
Wimbledon Championships